Mohamed Moktar Ibrahim is a Somali politician. He belongs to the Gal Je’el subclan of the Hawiye. He is the Minister of Fisheries and Marine Resources of Somalia, having been appointed to the position on 27 January 2015 by Prime Minister Omar Abdirashid Ali Sharmarke.

References

Living people
Government ministers of Somalia
Year of birth missing (living people)